A Dargah (Persian: درگاہ) is a Sufi shrine built over the grave of a revered religious figure, often a Sufi saint. Local Muslims visit the shrine known as ziyarat. Dargahs are often associated with Sufi meeting rooms and hostels, known as khanqah. They often include a mosque, meeting rooms, schools (madrassas), residences for a teacher or caretaker, hospitals, and other buildings for community purposes. The term is derived from a Persian word which can mean, among other uses, "portal" or "threshold". Many Muslims believe that dargahs are portals by which they can invoke the deceased saint's intercession and blessing (see Tawassul).

Dargah-e-Ghaffaria Quadiria
The dargah of the Sufi Saint Syed Abdul Gaffar Sha lies in Kamalapuram, Kadapa district in Andhra Pradesh state, India.

This shrine is also called Badi darga or pedda darga by the locals.

The dargah encompasses the mausoleum of Sufi saints:
 Shah Abdul Ghaffar Khan Khadri
 Dastageer Shah Khadri
 Khadir Mohiuddin Shah Khadri
 Noor-un-nisa Sahiba
 Zahiruddin Shah Khadri

See also 
 Dargahs in Andhra Pradesh

References

Dargahs in Andhra Pradesh